Austin & Lindsey Adamec, also known as A&LA, are an American Christian music husband-and-wife modern worship duo from Jacksonville, Florida. They started their music recording career in 2016. Their first extended play record, Austin & Lindsey Adamec, was released in 2016 by Radiate Music.

Background
The duo met while Austin Adamec was touring around Jacksonville, Florida, performing music at local churches and coffee-houses. Austin Adamec was pursuing a solo music career with Reunion Records, before coming together with his wife in 2016 to form the duo. She was a member of the contemporary Christian music pop group 1 Girl Nation until leaving in 2014.

Music history
The husband and wife duo commenced their music recording career together in 2016, with the extended play record Austin & Lindsey Adamec, released on March 25, 2016, by Radiate Music, a label operated and owned by Ian Eskelin.

Members
 Austin Mark Adamec (born March 21, 1988)
 Lindsey Brooke Adamec (née Ciresi) (born October 27, 1992)

Discography

EPs
 Austin & Lindsey Adamec (March 25, 2016, Radiate)

Singles

Albums

References

External links

American musical duos
Musical groups established in 2016
Musical groups from Jacksonville, Florida
2016 establishments in Florida